Flemington is an urban place, officially designated as a locality within the suburb of Homebush West in the Inner West of Sydney, in the state of New South Wales, Australia. Flemington is located 16 kilometres west of the Sydney central business district, in the local government area of the Municipality of Strathfield. The locality of Flemington has its own postcode (2129), separate from the remainder of Homebush West. It is entirely occupied by the Sydney Markets complex and its supporting infrastructure and has no residential population. "Flemington" was formerly the name of the whole suburb, and even today Homebush West as a whole is commonly referred to as "Flemington", even in official contexts.

Commercial area
Flemington is devoted to commercial developments. The area between Flemington railway station and Parramatta Road is the site of Sydney Markets. The markets feature a number of divisions including Produce, Flowers, Growers, Fresh Food, Motor, Swap & Sell, Paddy's Markets and Sydney Markets Plaza.  Sydney Markets Plaza, located near Parramatta Road, features a supermarket, hotel, post office, banks and many specialty shops below an office building. A different section of Sydney Markets Plaza lie to the east of the main market, and is technically in the suburb of Homebush, New South Wales.

The residential parts of the suburb formerly known as Flemington is now officially "Homebush West", although the name "Flemington" is still often applied to the whole of the suburb. The village commercial centre of Homebush West is located immediately south of Flemington railway station, and are often referred to as the "Flemington" shops or "Flemington" village centre. Centred on the Crescent and Henley Road, these include multiple grocery stores, restaurants, cafes, butchers and fishmongers, medical surgeries and pharmacies.

Transport
Flemington railway station is on the Inner West & Leppington Line of the Sydney Trains network. Parramatta Road and the M4 Western Motorway demarcate the northern border of Flemington. Homebush Bay Drive forms the western border.

History
This area was originally known Liberty Plains but was called Flemington by John Fleming, who was granted  here in 1806. The bush was turned into paddocks and later was the site of a cattle saleyard (which gave its name to Saleyards Creek). 

In 1892, the suburban part of Flemington, south of the railway, was incorporated into the Municipality of Strathfield as "Flemington Ward", but the saleyards north of the railway remained unincorporated until 1906, when it became part of the Municipality of Homebush, which also included North Homebush, north of the railway. The Municipality of Homebush was amalgamated with the Municipality of Strathfield in 1947.

In the early 1970s, the Sydney Markets were built at Flemington to relieve the Paddy's Markets at Haymarket, in the city. Since the establishment of Sydney Markets at Flemington in 1975, the residential part of the suburb, south of the railway line became known as Homebush West, named after the separate suburb of Homebush immediately to the east. "Flemington", as a locality within Homebush West, technically refers only to the market complex north of the railway. However, Homebush West as a whole is still commonly referred to as "Flemington", even in official contexts. Both the railway station serving the suburb and various organisations and businesses in the suburb still carry the name "Flemington".

Gallery

References
The Book of Sydney Suburbs, Compiled by Frances Pollen, Angus & Robertson Publishers, 1990, Published in Australia 
 Jones, Michael (1985). Oasis in the West: Strathfield's first hundred years. North Sydney: Allen & Unwin Australia. .

Sydney localities
Municipality of Strathfield